Stenoma cyphoxantha is a moth in the family Depressariidae. It was described by Edward Meyrick in 1931. It is found in French Guiana.

The wingspan is about 19 mm. The forewings are ochreous orange with the plical stigma blackish. The hindwings are light ochreous yellowish.

References

Moths described in 1931
Taxa named by Edward Meyrick
Stenoma